Julianatoren (English: Juliana Tower) is an amusement park which is located in the municipality of Apeldoorn. The park is built around the Queen Juliana Tower, which was built in 1910, and is currently a rijksmonument (listed building). The tower was built next to Het Loo Palace, to celebrate the birth of Queen Juliana of the Netherlands at the palace in 1909. Originally the tower was called Prinses Juliana Toren (Princess Juliana Tower) between 1910 and 1948, with an interval during the Second World War between 1940 and 1945 when it was called Juliana Toren (Juliana Tower). They are 450,000 visitors in 2009.

References

External links

Amusement parks in the Netherlands
1910 establishments in the Netherlands
Towers in Gelderland
Rijksmonuments in Apeldoorn
Towers completed in 1910
20th-century architecture in the Netherlands